The 2022 Barcelona Dragons season is the second season of the new Barcelona Dragons team in the European League of Football.

Preseason
After a moderate first season, their head coach Adam Rita announced, that he will not return to Barcelona and will become the new head coach of the Catania Elephants. On November 15, 2021 the franchise announced the re-signing of their first player with local hero Àlex González and later their first transfer with the signing of Eduardo Sánchez from the Panthers Wrocław. Furthermore, the management came to an agreement with the municipality Reus to use their stadion for the 2022 and 2023 season. On March 10, 2022 Andrew Weidinger was presented as the new head coach.

Regular season

Standings

Schedule
 
Source: europeanleague.football

Play-offs

Attendance

Roster

Awards

ELF Honors 2022 Awards

ELF All Stars Awards

ELF Honors 2022. Nominees

MVP of the Week

ELF Stats Leaders. Regular Season

NFL International Combine 2022 (IPPP)

Statistics

Team Leaders. Regular Season

Offensive

Defensive

Returns

Kicking

Transactions

In Season Roster moves. Players Signed

23rd Jun: Sergio Barbero QB 

16th Jun: Jairus Moll DB  , Josep Tricas LS 

04th Jun: Junior Varela DL  , Miguel Angel Kabankaya OL 

01st Jun: Michael Sam DL

In Season Roster moves. Players Released

02nd Sep: Mathias Hummelmose OL  , Junior Varela DL  

07th Jul: Aron Sola DE  , Joel Cabre LB 

30th Jun: Ruben Quintana TE 

23rd Jun: Luis Sanchez WR  , Bartolome Flaquer QB  

16th Jun: Shawn Wilson DB 

04th Jun: Jean Marc Ciocan DL 

31st May: Max Nazewicz LB

Staff

Notes

References 

Barcelona Dragons (ELF) seasons
2022 in Spanish sport
Barcelona Dragons